Halieutopsis vermicularis is a species of fish in the family Ogcocephalidae.

It is found in the Philippines.

References

Ogcocephalidae
Marine fish genera
Fish described in 1912
Taxa named by Hugh McCormick Smith
Taxa named by Lewis Radcliffe